The 1993 Italian local elections were held on 6 and 20 June, on 21 November and 5 December. It was the first time where citizens could vote both for the mayor and the city council, as for the provincial president and the provincial council.

The elections were won by the Democratic Party of the Left, led by Achille Occhetto and his centre-left to left-wing alliance. But the elections were also characterized by a strong aftermath of the Northern League in Northern Italy and the Italian Social Movement in Central and Southern Italy.

These elections caused the end of the traditional parties which ruled Italy for almost fifty years, like the Christian Democracy, the Socialist Party, the Democratic Socialist Party, the Republican Party and the Liberal Party.

Municipal elections

Mayoral election results

Overall parties results

Provincial elections

Presidential election results

See also
1993 Milan municipal election
1993 Rome municipal election

References

1993 elections in Italy
 
Municipal elections in Italy
June 1993 events in Europe